14 On Fire was a concert tour by the Rolling Stones, which started on 21 February 2014 in Abu Dhabi. It was a follow-up to the 50 & Counting tour which celebrated the 50th anniversary of the band. The tour was very much similar to the 50 & Counting just as the "Urban Jungle" portion of the Stones' Steel Wheels/Urban Jungle Tour in 1990 was similar to the "Steel Wheels" portion in 1989. 14 On Fire had the same stage design, setlist structure, and clothing/merchandise as 50 & Counting. Also, Mick Taylor was a guest throughout this tour as in 50 & Counting.

History
On 3 December 2013, the full Australian and New Zealand tour dates were announced and being billed as the 14 On Fire tour. The same day, they announced four other dates in Asia and for the first time one show in Abu Dhabi, Middle East. On 17 January 2014, they announced that they will play a one-off show at the Shanghai Mercedes-Benz Arena on 12 March 2014. On 13 February 2014, they announced that they will play a one-night only show at the Singapore Marina Bay Sands Grand Ballroom on 15 March 2014. On 12 March 2014, they announced that they will headline the Pinkpop Festival in the Netherlands and the TW Classic Festival in Belgium in June 2014. On 17 March 2014, they announced two one-off shows in Germany in June while more major shows in Europe in May, June and July 2014 were announced the following week.

Following L'Wren Scott's sudden death on 17 March in New York City, Mick Jagger, her life partner since 2001, flew to Los Angeles while the rest of the band returned to England. Scott's body was flown to Los Angeles where Jagger and Scott's brother, Randy Bambrough, coordinated an intimate service on 25 March with about 70 people in attendance. All the Australia and New Zealand shows were subsequently postponed with new dates to be scheduled between 25 October and 22 November 2014. Those dates were announced on 15 April 2014 while two new shows were added (1 at the Perth Arena and 1 at Hope Estate, Hunter Valley) along with the originally scheduled shows. There were to be a total of 8 shows in Australia and 1 in New Zealand. The performance on 25 October at the Adelaide Oval was the first be held at the venue since its complete redevelopment.

On 4 June 2014, the Rolling Stones performed for the first time in Israel in what was dubbed a historic appearance, the Haaretz going as far as describing the concert as being "Historic with a capital H".
To an extent, the Stones' Israeli debut provided a means of closure vis-à-vis the early background of Rock n' Roll in Israel; in 1965, Prime Minister David Ben Gurion and numerous politicians in the Knesset, Israel's parliament, had believed at the time that rock performances might corrupt the minds of the Israeli youth. Accordingly, at the time, the State of Israel had cancelled scheduled performances of notable artists.

On 6 November 2014, they were forced to cancel the show at Hanging Rock scheduled for 8 November after Jagger had developed a throat infection. He was under strict doctor's orders to rest his vocal chords in order to recuperate for the remainder of the tour.

Tour rehearsals and secret warm-up show
In preparation for the tour, prior to the first show, the Rolling Stones rehearsed 65 songs in Bondy near Paris from 3 to 14 February 2014 (in a rehearsal studio named Planet Live). On 14 February 2014, the 10th and last day of rehearsals, the Rolling Stones invited fans to attend an intimate show at the rehearsals studio in Bondy. Thus, the band performed an impromptu secret warm-up show playing 11 songs to the first 27 fans among a total of approximately 50 ones which were initially standing in front of the studio waiting for the band to appear.
For the summer leg of the tour in Europe, the band rehearsed in London from 14 to 22 May before moving final rehearsals to the Telenor Arena in Oslo, Norway where they played their first show on 26 May 2014.

Set list
This set list is representative of the opening performance in Abu Dhabi. It does not represent all concerts for the duration of the tour.
 "Start Me Up"
 "It's Only Rock 'n' Roll (But I Like It)"
 "You Got Me Rocking"
 "Tumbling Dice"
 "Emotional Rescue"
 "Angie"
 "Doom and Gloom"
"Out of Control"
 "Paint It Black"
 "Honky Tonk Women"
 "Slipping Away"
 "Before They Make Me Run"
 "Midnight Rambler"
 "Miss You"
 "Gimme Shelter"
 "Jumpin' Jack Flash"
 "Sympathy for the Devil"
 "Brown Sugar"
 "You Can't Always Get What You Want"
 "(I Can't Get No) Satisfaction"

Tour dates

Personnel

The Rolling Stones
Mick Jagger – lead vocals, guitars, harmonica, percussion
Keith Richards – guitars, backing vocals
Charlie Watts – drums
Ronnie Wood – guitars

Special guest
 Mick Taylor – guitars

Additional musicians
Darryl Jones – bass guitar
Chuck Leavell – keyboards
Lisa Fischer – backing vocals, percussion
Bobby Keys – saxophone 
Karl Denson – saxophone 
Tim Ries – saxophone, keyboards
Bernard Fowler – backing vocals, percussion
Matt Clifford – French horn, keyboards

See also
 The Rolling Stones concerts

Notes

References

External links
 The Rolling Stones (Official site)

The Rolling Stones concert tours
2014 concert tours